Noelia Vargas Mena (born 17 April 2000) is a Costa Rican racewalker. She competed in the women's 20 kilometres walk at the 2020 Summer Olympics held in Tokyo, Japan. In 2019, she competed in the women's 20 kilometres walk event at the 2019 World Athletics Championships held in Doha, Qatar. She finished in 36th place with a time of 1:46:30. She also competed in the same event at the 2022 World Athletics Championships held in Eugene, Oregon, United States.

In 2018, she competed in the women's 10,000 metres walk at the 2018 IAAF World U20 Championships held in Tampere, Finland. She finished in 9th place.

In 2019, she competed in the women's 20 kilometres walk event at the 2019 Pan American Games held in Lima, Peru. She finished in 6th place with a personal best of 1:33:09.

References

External links 
 

Living people
2000 births
Place of birth missing (living people)
Costa Rican female racewalkers
World Athletics Championships athletes for Costa Rica
Pan American Games competitors for Costa Rica
Athletes (track and field) at the 2019 Pan American Games
Athletes (track and field) at the 2020 Summer Olympics
Olympic athletes of Costa Rica
Olympic female racewalkers
21st-century Costa Rican women